The following public artworks are installed in Vancouver, Washington, United States:

 Blue Messenger, George Batho
 Boat of Discovery, Jay Rood
 Captain George Vancouver, Jim Demetro
 Child with Fish
 Clark County Veterans War Memorial
 Firsts Monument
 Flying Umbrellas, Cobalt Designworks
 A Gift for You, Jim Demetro
 Glyph Singer, James Lee Hansen
 Headwaters at Vancouver Waterfront Park
 Heart & Stone, Cobalt Designworks
 Ilchee Plaza, Eric Jensen
 Monument to the Three Kichis
 Movie Madness, Paul Springer
 Napoleon Light Field Cannons
 Phoenix, Andrew Carson
 Phrogy
 The Pioneer Mother Memorial, Avard Fairbanks
 Salmon Run Bell Tower
 South Main Landmark, Jim Walsh
 Spike Flower, Manuel Izquierdo
 Vancouver Housing Authority Clock, The Verdin Company
 The Visitor, Matthew Dockrey
 Wendy Rose, Women Who Weld & Cobalt Designworks
 Wheel Series, Don Wilson
 Winged Woman, Beth Heron

References

 Vancouver's Public Art (PDF), City of Vancouver, Washington

Culture of Vancouver, Washington
Vancouver
Vancouver, Washington